Phanerochaete velutina is a plant pathogen infecting peach and nectarine trees.

References

Fungal tree pathogens and diseases
Stone fruit tree diseases
velutina
Fungi described in 1815
Taxa named by Augustin Pyramus de Candolle